The Epic is an EP by Canadian hip hop duo Citizen Kane, released in 1997, by independent label Treehouse Records. It was nominated for Best Rap Recording at the 1999 Juno Awards.

Track listing

Samples
"Raisin' Kane" contains a sample of "Nights Are Forever Without You" by Bob James
"The Gambler" contains a sample of "I Love Music" by Ahmad Jamal
"Lost Angels" contains a sample of "Funny How Time Flies (When You're Having Fun)" by Janet Jackson

References

1997 debut EPs
Albums produced by K-Cut (producer)
Citizen Kane (band) albums
Hip hop EPs